Save the Children Federation, Inc., commonly known as Save the Children USA, is a non-profit organization working to improve the lives of children in the United States and around the world. Their headquarters is located in Fairfield, Connecticut, United States.

Save the Children USA was formed in 1932 to help children in the Appalachian mountains during the Great Depression, and modeled on the Save the Children Fund which had been established in Britain in 1919.

Save the Children USA is part of Save the Children International, which has operations in over 120 countries around the world. Save the Children received a 4-star rating from Charity Navigator between 2001 and 2014, a 3-star rating between 2015 and 2017, and a 4-star rating in 2018 and 2019.

Current Work & Operations
Save the Children works in the United States and around the world, responding to global emergencies and conflict. The organization can assemble a world-class team of health professionals to work for children in crisis anywhere in the world within 72 hours.

The charity works in over 200 of the poorest communities in rural America. Programs are focused on ensuring children are kindergarten-ready, reading by third grade, have safe places to go after school, and maintain reading and math skills over the summer months. It also responds to natural disasters in the U.S.

Internationally, Save the Children works in Yemen, Syria, Rohingya refugees in Bangladesh, and on both sides of the U.S. Southern border. It also provided relief during the COVID-19 pandemic.

Through campaign and advocacy work, Save the Children ensures children's voices are heard.

Ambassadors
Save the Children Ambassadors are high-profile individuals, widely-recognized as prominent members of their field, who demonstrate a shared vision and common goals with Save the Children, and who commit over a long period of time to support Save the Children's mission.

Save the Children's Ambassadors help promote the organization's work, raise funds and advocate to create lasting change for children in need in the United States and around the world. As of February 2020, current Ambassadors include Camila Cabello, Dakota Fanning, Jennifer Garner, Enrique Iglesias, Cobie Smulders, Olivia Wilde and Rachel Zoe.

Reports

As part of its advocacy role, Save the Children USA commissions research to support its mission. Amongst the reports are a 2016 paper on a method for direct assessment of child development. Stop the War reports, discussing war crimes against children, were published in 2019, 2020, and 2021. The organisation also published a report on how COVID-19 had affected children's lives.

Save the Children USA published an annual End of Childhood Report and an End of Childhood Index that evaluates countries against a common set of life-changing events that can signal the disruption of childhood.

Controversies

Sponsorship scandal (1998)
In March 1998, Save the Children USA became embroiled in a scandal that was investigated by the Chicago Tribune. The investigation uncovered two dozen donors were making contributions to dead children. The scandal resulted in the dismissal of an employee that was based in Mali. Three additional employees were reprimanded for allowing these deaths to go unreported. An American family with the surname "Dixon" was sending $20/month to a child by the name of Abdoul Kone who died of a donkey cart accident nearly 3 years earlier.

Mugs with traces of lead (1998)
In October 1998, Save the Children USA recalled approximately 2,000 mugs when it was revealed that their lead content, while in compliance with Federal guidelines, exceeded the levels in a voluntary standard to be introduced in California the following year.

QAnon attempt to co-opt #SaveTheChildren 

In 2020 proponents of the unproven far-right conspiracy theory QAnon attempted to co-opt the hashtag #SaveTheChildren, leading to a temporary block of the hashtag on Facebook. On August 7 Save the Children issued a statement on the unauthorized use of its name in campaigns.

References

1932 establishments in the United States
Organizations established in 1932
Children's charities based in the United States
USA
Non-profit organizations based in Connecticut